Mary Detournay (married name Stevens), was a female international table tennis player from Belgium.

She won a bronze medal at the 1947 World Table Tennis Championships in the women's doubles with Josee Wouters. 

She won six Belgian titles between 1937 and 1952.

See also
 List of table tennis players
 List of World Table Tennis Championships medalists

References

Belgian female table tennis players
World Table Tennis Championships medalists